Copper is a chemical element with symbol Cu and atomic number 29.

Copper or The Copper may also refer to:

Color
 Copper (color), the color of the metal
 Copper (heraldry), when used as a metal tincture in heraldry

Places
 Copper Mountain (disambiguation)
 Copper Lake (disambiguation)

United States
 Copper, Oregon (disambiguation)
 Copper, Jackson County, Oregon, a submerged town
 Copper Salmon Wilderness, Oregon
 Copper Mine Gulch, California
 Copper Mountains, Arizona
 Copper Peak, Michigan
 Copper Country, an area in the Upper Peninsula of Michigan
 Copper River (Alaska), a 300-mile (480 km) river in south-central Alaska

Other
 Copper Coast or "Copper Triangle", an area of South Australia noted for its mining
 Copper Nunataks, Antarctic Peninsula

People

Surname
 Copper family, a long-established English family of folk singers
 Basil Copper (1924–2013), English writer and journalist
 Ger Copper (1953-2020), Dutch magician
 Kahleah Copper (born 1994), basketball player
 Terrance Copper (born 1982), American footballer

Nickname
 Copper Kent (1891 – ), Australian rugby union player

Arts and entertainment
 Copper (comic), a web and print comic by Kazu Kibuishi
 Copper (TV series), a BBC America period TV drama 2012–2013
 Rookie Blue (working title Copper), a Canadian police drama 2010–2015
 The Copper (1930 film), a British-German film directed by Richard Eichberg
 The Copper (1958 film), a West German film directed by Eugen York
 "Copper", a song by Shellac from Terraform
 Copper, a fictional dog in the 1967 novel The Fox and the Hound (novel) and its 1981 film adaptation, The Fox and the Hound

Biology
 Copper-colored restrepia, a copper-colored orchid
 Copper shark (Carcharhinus brachyurus), also known as the bronze whaler or narrowtooth shark
 Copperhead may refer to any of three different species of snakes:
 Agkistrodon contortrix, a venomous pit viper species found in parts of North America
 Austrelaps, a genus of venomous elapids found in southern Australia and Tasmania
 Elaphe radiata (copperhead rat snake), a nonvenomous species found in southern Asia
 The coppers, a nickname for the Lycaeninae, a family of butterflies
 Copper ant-blue (Acrodipsas cuprea), found in Australia, from southern Queensland to Victoria
 Copper pencil-blue (Candalides cyprotus), found along the east coast of Australia, including South Australia, New South Wales, Western Australia and Victoria
 The copper underwing (Amphipyra pyramidea), a moth of the family Noctuidae, distributed across the Palaearctic region

Elements, materials, and technology
 Copper, a coin of low value, brown- or copper-colored
 Copper, a shaped ingot or ornamental sheet of the metal used by indigenous tribes of the North American West Coast region in potlatch ceremonies, as a show of wealth (ingot) and as a symbolic representation of a slave (sheet)
 Copper, telecommunications jargon for twisted pair connections
 Copper, the Manhattan Project's codename for plutonium 
 Copper, short for "co-processor", part of the original Amiga chipset
 Copper, a brew kettle for making beer
 Native copper, a naturally occurring mineral consisting of pure copper
 Wash copper or just copper, a large cauldron used for heating water and laundry

Other uses
 Copper ale, a style of beer
 Copper Riot (1662), a major riot which took place in Moscow
 Copper Project, a cloud-based project management software tool
 COPPeR (short for Cultural Office of the Pikes Peak Region), an arts organization in Colorado Springs, Colorado
 Copper Age, a phase in human technological development
 "Copper", British or Australian slang for a police officer, hence the North American 'cop'

See also
 Capper (disambiguation)
 Coppa (disambiguation)
 Coppers (disambiguation)
 Koppa (disambiguation)
 Isotopes of copper